Teucrium scordium is a species of flowering plant belonging to the family Lamiaceae.

Its native range is Europe to China.

References

scordium
Flora of Malta